Nyctidromus is a genus of nightjars in the family Caprimulgidae. The species are widely distributed in Central and South America.

Taxonomy
The genus Nyctidromus was introduced in 1838 by the English ornithologist John Gould to accommodate his newly described Nyctidromus derbyanus. This taxon is therefore the type species; it is now considered as a subspecies of the pauraque, Nyctidromus albicollis (Gmelin) 1789. The genus name combines the Ancient Greek nukti- meaning "nocturnal" or "night-" with -dromos meaning "-racer" (from trekhō "to run").

The genus contains two species:

 Pauraque,  Nyctidromus albicollis
 Anthony's nightjar,  Nyctidromus anthonyi

References

 
Bird genera